Francesco Bruyere (born 27 August 1980 in Carmagnola) is an Italian judoka.

Achievements

References

External links
 

1980 births
Living people
People from Carmagnola
Italian male judoka
Italian people of French descent
Judoka of Fiamme Azzurre
Sportspeople from the Metropolitan City of Turin